Kamauliwahine (wahine = “woman”) was Chiefess of Molokaʻi.

Kamauliwahine was the only known child of Lanileo and Chiefess Kapau-a-Nuʻakea of Molokai. Kamauliwahine succeeded her mother in the dignity of Aliʻi Nui.

Kamauliwahine's daughter was Hualani and she inherited the monarchy after her motherʻs death. Father of Hualani was Laniaiku.

References

Abraham Fornander. An Account of the Polynesian Race: Its Origin and Migrations.

Hawaiian monarchs
Hawaiian chiefesses